was a Japanese novelist and songwriter. He won the 122nd Naoki Prize.

Career
Nakanishi was born Reizō Nakanishi in Mudanjiang, Manchukuo. He graduated from Kudan High School in Tokyo and received a degree in French literature from Rikkyo University.  He lived in Zushi, Kanagawa.

He first worked on translations of French chanson songs, but while on honeymoon he made the acquaintance of Yujiro Ishihara and became a Japanese popular song (kayōkyoku) writer.  He is one of the main lyricists in the world of post-World War II kayōkyoku.  He gave the world an extensive collection of works—songs such as "Kyou de owakare" and "Kita sakaba" which became big hits, but also a large proportion of unusual songs.  In 1969, his total sales exceeded 10 million records.  He has displayed talent in many fields, including concert and stage production, movie performance, singing, composing, translation, novel and essay writing, and cultural broadcasting (as a personality on "Sei! Yangu!" and as a regular on NHK's "N-kyō").

However, behind his showy life, he suffered from difficulties such as heart disease, divorce, and having to repay his elder brother's extensive debts.  From those personal experiences came novels such as Kyōdai and Sakura no densetsu.  He was a pacifist and desired reconciliation with China and Korea, and this shows in his writing style and speech.

He gave up lyric writing at the end of the Shōwa era and concentrated on opera production and performance and novel and essay writing.  Kyōdai was nominated in 1998 for the 119th Naoki Prize.  Nagasaki burabura-setsu won the 122nd Naoki Prize in 2000.

Recently, Nakanishi served as a commentator on the Japanese "wide show" Wide! Scramble! on the Asahi Television Network.

Nakanishi died in Tokyo on 23 December 2020, at the age of 82, after suffering a heart attack.

Awarded Songs

References

External links
 IMdb entry for Rei Nakanishi
 IMdb entry for Nagasaki Burabura
 

20th-century Japanese novelists
21st-century Japanese novelists
Japanese people from Manchukuo
People from Zushi, Kanagawa
People from Mudanjiang
1938 births
2020 deaths
Rikkyo University alumni
Naoki Prize winners